The right of reply or right of correction generally means the right to defend oneself against public criticism in the same venue where it was published. In some countries, such as Brazil, it is a legal or even constitutional right. In other countries, it is not a legal right as such, but a right which certain media outlets and publications choose to grant to people who have been severely criticised by them, as a matter of editorial policy.

As a constitutional right

Brazil
The Brazilian Constitution guarantees the right of reply (direito de resposta).

As a legal right

Europe

European Union
In Europe, there have been proposals for a legally enforceable right of reply that applies to all media, including newspapers, magazines, and other print media, along with radio, television, and the internet. In 1974, the Committee of Ministers of the Council of Europe already voted a resolution granting a right of reply to all individuals. Article 1 of a 2004 Council of Europe recommendation defined a right of reply as: offering a possibility to react to any information in the media presenting inaccurate facts … which affect … personal rights.

Individual countries
In the federal system of Germany, the individual federal states are responsible for education, cultural affairs, and also the press and electronic media. All press laws of the 16 federal states guarantee the right to a counter presentation of factual statements which are deemed to be wrong by the individuals and organisations concerned. This is based on article 11 the national press law of 1874, and is found in all 16 laws as §11 or §10 in slightly modified versions.

Austria and Switzerland have similar laws on the book. In Austria, this is in article 9 of the national media law, in Switzerland in article 28g of the civil code.

In France, the right to a corrective reply goes back to the article 13 of the Law on the freedom of the press of July 29, 1881 and is renewed and extended to broadcast and digital media via various laws and decrees.

The Belgian law on the right to reply emerged in 1831 as article 13 of the 1831 decree on the press. This was replaced 130 years later by the law on the droit de réponse or «loi du 23 juin 1961». Originally referring only to the printed press, this law was amended in 1977 by the law of  «4 mars 1977 relative au droit de réponse dans l’audiovisuel» i.e. audiovisual media, published in the Moniteur Belge of March 15, 1977. Since the federalisation of the Belgian state in 1980, the language communities are responsible for the media, and so the Flemish community has passed in 2005 a decrée dated March 4, 2005, which regulates the right to reply in articles 177 to 199, and the German language community has passed the decree of 27 June 2005, which simply refers to the law of 1961 as amended in 1977.

United Nations

The United Nations recognises the "International Right of Correction" through the "Convention on the International Right of Correction", which entered into force on August 24, 1962.

United States
A Florida right of reply law (referring to print media) was overturned by Miami Herald Publishing Co. v. Tornillo, 418 U.S. 241 (1974), while a FCC policy (referring to broadcast media) was affirmed in Red Lion Broadcasting Co. v. FCC,  395 U.S. 367  (1969). The policy was subsequently completely abandoned in 1987.

As an editorial policy

BBC
A right of reply can also be part of the editorial policy of a news publication or an academic journal. The BBC's Editorial Guidelines state:

When our output makes allegations of wrongdoing, iniquity or incompetence or lays out a strong and damaging critique of an individual or institution the presumption is that those criticised should be given a "right of reply", that is, given a fair opportunity to respond to the allegations.

Australasian Journal of Philosophy
The Australasian Journal of Philosophy's editorial policy says:

[A]uthors of the materials being commented on [in Discussion Notes] may be given a right of reply (subject to the usual refereeing), on the understanding that timely publication of the Note will take priority over the desirability of including both Note and Reply in the same issue of the Journal.

United States
In the U.S., there is a journalistic standard of including denials, exemplified by the ethical code of the Society of Professional Journalists: "Diligently seek subjects of news coverage to allow them to respond to criticism or allegations of wrongdoing."

See also
Fairness Doctrine
Audi alteram partem

References

External links
 Directory of press laws of the 16 German federal states  
 Article 28g of Swiss civil code guaranteeing the right to a corrective reply (German)
 Right to corrective reply in article 9 of the Austrian media law
 Belgian law on the right to reply of 1961
 RightOfReply.org is a non-profit site established to allow subjects of online criticism to respond to their critics, where requests for conspicuous right of reply has been denied within the critical publication

Criticism
Legal reasoning
Rights
Freedom of expression